Jae-yoon, also spelled Jae-yun, is a Korean unisex given name. Its meaning differs based on the hanja used to write each syllable of the name. There are 20 hanja with the reading "jae" and 16 hanja with the reading "yoon" on the South Korean government's official list of hanja which may be registered for use in given names.

People with this name include:
 (born 1965), South Korean politician; see List of members of the National Assembly (South Korea), 2012–2016
Jo Jae-yoon (born 1974), South Korean actor
Jung Jae-yoon (born 1981), South Korean football scout and former midfielder
Lee Jae-yoon (born 1984), South Korean actor
Ma Jae-yoon (born 1987), South Korean professional computer gamer

See also
List of Korean given names

References

Korean unisex given names